Punu may refer to:

 Punu people, a people of Gabon
 Punu language, the language of the Punu people
 Bunu languages or Punu languages, the Hmongic languages of the Yao people of China
 Penu, Golestan or Pūnū, a village in Golestan, Iran
 Punu Chanyu, chanyu of the Xiongnu empire

See also
Puno, Peru

Language and nationality disambiguation pages